Diego Fores López (born 19 May 1992) is an Argentine professional footballer who plays as a right-back for Estudiantes BA.

Career
López began his senior career with San Salvador de Jujuy's Gimnasia y Esgrima. Mario Gómez promoted the defender into the club's senior squad towards the end of the 2011–12 Primera B Nacional, with his professional debut arriving in a goalless tie with their La Plata namesakes; he made five more appearances that campaign. Fifty-nine more matches in all competitions occurred for López with Gimnasia y Esgrima, across six Primera B Nacional seasons. On 1 July 2016, López joined fellow second tier team Central Córdoba. After thirty-one appearances and relegation, López moved to Mendoza's Gimnasia y Esgrima.

Whilst with Gimnasia y Esgrima, López netted his first career goal during a 5–0 home win over Unión Aconquija on 12 October 2017. He participated in twenty-four fixtures as they won promotion to Primera B Nacional. López left on 30 June 2018 to rejoin Gimnasia y Esgrima of Jujuy. Ahead of the 2022 season, López moved to Estudiantes de Buenos Aires.

Career statistics
.

References

External links

1992 births
Living people
Sportspeople from Jujuy Province
Argentine footballers
Association football defenders
Primera Nacional players
Torneo Federal A players
Gimnasia y Esgrima de Jujuy footballers
Central Córdoba de Santiago del Estero footballers
Gimnasia y Esgrima de Mendoza footballers
Estudiantes de Buenos Aires footballers